Saint-Symphorien-de-Lay (literally Saint-Symphorien of Lay) is a commune in the Loire department in the Auvergne-Rhône-Alpes region.

Population

Personalities
The commune was the birthplace of Suzanne Aubert.

See also
Communes of the Loire department

References

Communes of Loire (department)